The following is a list of major areas of legal practice and important legal subject-matters.

From, one of the five capital lawyers in Roman Law, Domitius Ulpianus, (170–223) – who differentiated ius publicum versus ius privatum – the European, more exactly the continental law, philosophers and thinkers want(ed) to put each branch of law into this dichotomy: Public and Private Law. “huius studdii duæ sunt positiones: publicum et privatum. Publicum ius est, quod statum rei Romanæ spectat, privatum, quod ad singulorum utilitatem; sunt enim quædam publice utila, quædam privatim". (Public law is that, which concerns Roman state, private law is concerned with the interests of citizens.) In the modern era Charles-Louis Montesquieu (1689–1755) amplified supremely this distinction: International (law of nations), Public (politic law) and Private (civil law) Law, in his major work: (On) The Spirit of the Law (1748). “Considered as inhabitants of so great a planet, which necessarily contains a variety of nations, they have laws relating to their mutual intercourse, which is what we call the law of nations. As members of a society that must be properly supported, they have laws relating to the governors and the governed, and this we distinguish by the name of politic law. They have also another sort of law, as they stand in relation to each other; by which is understood the civil law.”

By area of study and practice 
 Administrative law
 Admiralty law or maritime law
 Adoption law
 Agency law
 Alcohol law
 Alternative dispute resolution
 Animal law
 Antitrust law (or competition law)
 Art law (or art and culture law)
 Aviation law
 Banking law
 Bankruptcy law (creditor debtor rights law or insolvency and reorganization law)
 Bioethics
 Business law (or commercial law); commercial litigation
 Business organizations law (or companies law)
 Canon law
 Civil law or common law
 Class action litigation/Mass tort litigation
 Communications law
 Computer law
 Competition law
 Conflict of law (or private international law)
 Constitutional law
 Construction law
 Consumer law
 Contract law
 Copyright law
 Corporate law (or company law), also corporate compliance law and corporate governance law
 Criminal law
 Cryptography law
 Cultural property law
 Custom (law)
 Cyber law
 Defamation
 Drug control law
 Education law
 Elder law
 Employment law
 Energy law
 Entertainment law
 Environmental law
 Family law
 Financial services regulation law
 Firearm law
 Food law
 Gaming law
 Health and safety law
 Health law
 Housing law
 Immigration law
 Insurance law
 Intellectual property law
 International law
 International human rights law
 International humanitarian law
 International trade and finance law
 Internet law
 Juvenile law
 Labour law (or Labor law)
 Landlord–tenant law
 Litigation
 Martial law
 Media law
 Medical law
 Military law
 Mining law
 Mortgage law
 Music law
 Nationality law
 Obscenity law
 Parliamentary law
 Patent law
 Poverty law
 Privacy law
 Procedural law
 Property law
 Public health law
 Public International Law
 Real estate law
 Securities law / Capital markets law
 Space law
 Sports law
 Statutory law
 Tax law
 Technology law
 Tort law
 Trademark law
 Transport law / Transportation law
 Trusts & estates law
 Water law

See also 
 List of legal topics
 List of legal terms

References

Law-related lists